Keith Robert Simpson (born 29 March 1949) is a British Conservative Party politician and military historian who served as Member of Parliament (MP) for Broadland from 2010 to 2019, having previously served as the MP for Mid Norfolk from 1997 to 2010.

Early life 
Simpson was born in Norwich, the son of Harry Simpson and Jean Day.  He was educated at Thorpe Grammar School (now known as Thorpe St Andrew School), in Thorpe St Andrew, Norfolk. He went on earn a BA in History at the University of Hull, and undertook postgraduate research in War Studies at King's College London, where he completed a PGCE in 1975.

Political career 
Simpson served as the National Vice-Chairman of the Federation of Conservative Students from 1972–73.

He was Head of Foreign Affairs and Defence at Conservative Central Office from 1986–88. From 1988–90, he was a Political Adviser to the Secretary of State for Defence (first to George Younger, and then to Tom King).

Simpson was the Conservative Parliamentary candidate for Plymouth Devonport at the 1992 general election, where he lost to the Labour candidate David Jamieson.

At the 1997 general election, Simpson was elected as the Member of Parliament for Mid Norfolk with a majority of 1,336.

In July 1997, Simpson was appointed to the Conservative Parliamentary Defence Committee. In June 1998, he was appointed a frontbench defence spokesman. From June 1999 to June 2001, he was an Opposition Whip responsible for Treasury, Home Affairs and Health. He was subsequently appointed Shadow Agriculture Spokesman in October 2001. From 2002–05, he was Shadow Minister for Defence, and from 2005–10 he served as Shadow Minister for Foreign Affairs.

During its extensive coverage of the United Kingdom parliamentary expenses scandal, The Daily Telegraph published the story that Simpson had claimed £185 for light bulbs over a period of four years.

Following parliamentary boundary changes and prior to the 2010 general election, Simpson's constituency of Mid Norfolk was redrawn. He was selected to stand for the newly created seat of Broadland, which derived from parts of the Mid Norfolk, Norfolk North and Norwich North constituencies. Simpson won the seat with a majority of 7,292.

Following the 2010 general election, Simpson was appointed the Parliamentary Private Secretary to the Foreign Secretary, William Hague, in the Conservative-Liberal Democrat coalition government.

In May 2014 he was one of seven unsuccessful candidates for the chairmanship of the House of Commons Defence Select Committee.

In March 2015, he was appointed to the Privy Council of the United Kingdom and therefore granted the title The Right Honourable.

Simpson was opposed to Brexit prior to the 2016 referendum.

Simpson stood down at the 2019 general election.

Career outside politics 

As a military historian, Simpson has served as Director of the Cranfield Security Studies Institute at Cranfield University from 1991–7, and as a Senior Lecturer in War Studies and International Affairs at the Royal Military Academy Sandhurst from 1973–86. He is the author of five books on military history. It was also in this capacity that he was invited to debate masculine violence with a drunken Oliver Reed on an infamous edition of the late night Channel 4 television programme After Dark, broadcast on 26 January 1991. Reed confronted him and called him 'flash boy'.

Personal life 
Simpson married Pepita, the daughter of Norman Hollingsworth, on 4 August 1984 at the Royal Memorial Chapel, Sandhurst. The couple currently live in Coltishall, Norfolk, and have one son.

Bibliography

References

External links 
 

 Centre for First World War Studies
 BBC NEWS | Politics | Find Your MP | Norfolk Mid | Keith Simpson
 

1949 births
Living people
Alumni of the University of Hull
Alumni of King's College London
Conservative Party (UK) MPs for English constituencies
UK MPs 1997–2001
UK MPs 2001–2005
UK MPs 2005–2010
UK MPs 2010–2015
UK MPs 2015–2017
UK MPs 2017–2019
Academics of Cranfield University
Politicians from Norwich
People from Reepham, Norfolk
Members of the Privy Council of the United Kingdom